This is a list of United Nations Security Council Resolutions 2001 to 2100 adopted between 28 July 2011 and 25 April 2013.

See also 
 Lists of United Nations Security Council resolutions
 List of United Nations Security Council Resolutions 1901 to 2000
 List of United Nations Security Council Resolutions 2101 to 2200

References 

2001